The 1948–49 A Group was the inaugural season of the A Football Group, the top Bulgarian professional league for association football clubs.

Overview
It was contested by 10 teams, and Levski Sofia won the championship undefeated.

League standings

Results

Champions
Levski Sofia

Coach Rezső Somlai

Top scorers

Source:1948–49 Top Goalscorers

References

External links
Bulgaria - List of final tables (RSSSF)
Bulgarian Football Archive - bulgarian-football.com

First Professional Football League (Bulgaria) seasons
Bulgaria
1948–49 in Bulgarian football